Dogok Station is a station on the Seoul Subway Line 3 and Suin-Bundang Line in Gangnam-gu, Seoul. This station serves one of the most affluent neighborhoods in Korea; the Samsung Tower Palace complex, which includes one of the tallest buildings in South Korea, has a direct passageway link with the station. Another set of high-wealth residential apartments - the Dongbu Centreville - is also linked by an underground passageway. Other nearby high-wealth apartments include Dogok Rexle complex and Daechi I-Park.

Due to pipes running underneath the 4-way road intersection at which this station is located, it is built deep underground. For example, the Bundang Line platform is 6 floors below ground level.

Vicinity
Exit 1: Sookmyung Girls' High School, Seoul Daedo Elementary School, Dogok Rexle APT
Exit 2: Dongbu Centreville APT, Raemian Daechi Palace APT
Exit 3: Daecheong Middle School
Exit 4: Samsung Tower Palace

References 

Seoul Metropolitan Subway stations
Metro stations in Gangnam District
Railway stations opened in 1993
Bundang Line
Seoul Subway Line 3